Pedapatnam lanka is a village in Mamidikuduru Mandal in Andhra Pradesh.

See also 
Machilipatnam mandal

Villages in East Godavari district